David James "Dave" Smith (October 31, 1925 – March 8, 2014) was an American sailor and Olympic champion. He competed at the 1960 Summer Olympics in Rome and won a gold medal in the 5.5-meter class with the boat Minotaur. Smith was born in Salem, Massachusetts, and died in Peabody, Massachusetts.

References

External links 
 
 
 

1925 births
2014 deaths
American male sailors (sport)
Olympic gold medalists for the United States in sailing
Sailors at the 1960 Summer Olympics – 5.5 Metre
Medalists at the 1960 Summer Olympics